Live! Vampires is the first live album by American hard rock band L.A. Guns. Recorded in August 1991 at two shows in the United States, it was self-produced by the band and released in Japan only on February 26, 1992 by Vertigo Records. The majority of songs performed on the album are from the band's third studio album Hollywood Vampires, plus one each from L.A. Guns and Cocked & Loaded. Live! Vampires registered at number 91 on the Japanese Albums Chart.

Background
Released on March 16, 1992, Live! Vampires is a Japanese-only EP featuring six live tracks and two outtakes. All tracks except "One More Reason" were recorded at Irvine Meadows Amphitheatre in Irvine, California; "One More Reason" was recorded at Sunken Gardens in San Antonio, Texas. The two live outtakes – "It's Over Now" and "Crystal Eyes" – were produced by Hollywood Vampires producer and recording engineer Michael James Jackson.

Live! Vampires charted in the only region it was released, reaching number 91 on the Japanese Albums Chart. In his 2014 book HAIRcyclopedia Vol. 1: The Legends, Taylor T. Carlson claimed that Live! Vampires was the best L.A. Guns live release, claiming that it "captures the band back in their heyday, right before grunge took over and changed the music industry". Bradley Torreano of the music website AllMusic awarded the album 3.5 out of five stars.

Track listing

Personnel
L.A. Guns
Phil Lewis – lead vocals, production
Tracii Guns – lead guitar, backing vocals, production
Mick Cripps – rhythm guitar, backing vocals, production
Kelly Nickels – bass, backing vocals, production
Steve Riley – drums, backing vocals, production
Additional personnel
Michael James Jackson – production (tracks 7 and 8)

Chart positions

References

External links

1992 live albums
L.A. Guns live albums
Vertigo Records live albums